Ulrich Vig Vinzents (born 4 November 1976) is a Danish former professional footballer who played as a right-back.

Club career

In Denmark
Born in Ringsted, Vinzents started his professional career at Lyngby Boldklub however with a limited amount of play. He moved on to Køge BK and played there for three seasons before coming back to his old club Lyngby. Back in Lyngby Vinzents established himself in the starting eleven and played for four seasons before once again leaving the club, this time to FC Nordsjælland. After a couple of season's at the club he transferred to OB for three seasons before he moved overseas to Sweden and Malmö FF.

Malmö FF
Vinzents transferred to Malmö FF in 2006 and took a spot in the starting eleven from the start. For the coming five seasons he missed as few as seven games as he was in good form and rid of injuries. For the 2010 season Vinzents showed that he had a good defense as well as offensive skills which he demonstrated frequently by shooting cross balls from the right flank. In 2010 Vinzents finally won his first title as Malmö FF became Swedish champions. Vinzents played 29 out of 30 possible league games and was one of the reasons for the team's successful defence.

Vinzents continued to play for the majority of Malmö FF's matches for the 2011 season with 23 Allsvenskan caps and 45 matches in total. He scored his first and only competitive goal for the club against Jönköpings Södra IF in Svenska Cupen on 11 May 2011. Vinzents signed a new contract on 22 June 2011 to keep him at the club for another season.

After captain Daniel Andersson decided to focus on his coaching role for the 2012 season Vinzents was given the captain's armband. However as Vinzents had some trouble with injuries throughout the season he only acted as captain for a few matches, most notably in his last match for Malmö FF on 4 November in an away game against AIK. On 1 November 2012, it was announced that Vinzents would leave the club after seven seasons. He was given a farewell ceremony on the pitch at Swedbank Stadion after the last home match of the season against Örebro SK.

Career statistics

Honours
Malmö FF
Allsvenskan: 2010

References

External links
  Malmö FF profile
  SvFF profile
 

1976 births
Living people
Danish men's footballers
Denmark under-21 international footballers
Lyngby Boldklub players
Køge Boldklub players
FC Nordsjælland players
Odense Boldklub players
Malmö FF players
Allsvenskan players
Danish Superliga players
Danish 1st Division players
Danish expatriate men's footballers
Expatriate footballers in Sweden
Association football fullbacks
People from Ringsted
Sportspeople from Region Zealand